Branko (Cyrillic script: Бранко) is a South Slavic male given name found in all of the former Yugoslavia. It is related to the names Branimir and Branislav, and the female equivalent is Branka.

People named Branko include:

 Branko Babić (born 1947), Serbian football manager
 Branko Baković (born 1981), Serbian footballer
 Branko Baletić (born 1946), Serbian-Montenegrin film director and producer
 Branko Bauer (1921–2002), Croatian film director
 Branko Bokun (1920–2011),  Yugoslav-British author and journalist
 Branko Bošković (born 1980), Montenegrin footballer
 Branko Bošnjak (1923–1996), Croatian philosopher
 Branko Bošnjak  (born 1955), Yugoslav footballer
 Branko Bošnjaković (born 1939), Dutch-Croatian physicist
 Branko Brnović (born 1967), Montenegrin football manager
 Branko Buljević (born 1947), Croatian-Australian footballer
 Branko Cikatić (1954–2020), Croatian martial artist
 Branko Crvenkovski (born 1962), Macedonian politician
 Branko Cvetković (born 1984), Bosnian basketball player
 Branko Ćopić (1915–1984), Yugoslav writer
 Branko Čulina (born 1957), Croatian-Australian football manager
 Branko Đurić (born 1962), Bosnian actor
 Branko Gračanin (born 1943), Croatian footballer
 Branko Grahovac (born 1983), Bosnian footballer
 Branko Grünbaum (1929–2018), Croatian-American mathematician
 Branko Horvat (1928–2003), Croatian economist and politician
 Branko Ilič (born 1983), Slovenian footballer
 Branko Isaković (born 1958), Serbian musician
 Branko Ivanković (born 1954), Croatian football manager
 Branko Jelić (born 1977), Serbian footballer
 Branko Kadija (1921–1942), Albanian communist of Serbian descent, People's Hero of Albania
 Branko Karačić (born 1960), Croatian football manager
 Branko Kostić (born 1939), Montenegrin Serb politician
 Branko Lazarević (born 1984), Serbian footballer
 Branko Lustig (1932–2019), Croatian film producer
 Branko Mamula (born 1921), Yugoslav officer and politician
 Branko Marinković (born 1967), Bolivian-Croatian politician and businessman.
 Branko Mihaljević (1931–2005), Croatian composer
 Branko Mikša (born 1947), Croatian politician
 Branko Mikulić (1928–1994), Yugoslav politician
 Branko Milanović (born 1953), Serbian-American economist
 Branko Milićević (born 1946), Serbian actor
 Branko Milisavljević (born 1976), Serbian basketball player
 Branko Miljković (1934–1961), Serbian poet
 Branko Miljuš (born 1960), Croatian footballer
 Branko Mladenović (fl. 1355), Serbian magnate
 Branko Nuss (born 1976), Basic Element (music group) accordion
 Branko Oblak (born 1947), Slovenian footballer
 Branko Panić (born 1977), Croatian footballer
 Branko Pavlović (born 1960), Serbian politician and lawyer
 Branko Peković (born 1979), Serbian water polo player
 Branko Pleše (1915–1980), Croatian footballer
 Branko Radičević (1924–1953), Serbian poet
 Branko Radivojević (born 1980), Slovak ice hockey player
 Branko Radovanović (born 1981), Serbian footballer
 Branko Rasić (born 1976), Serbian footballer
 Branko Rašović (born 1942), Montenegrin footballer
 Branko Schmidt (born 1957), Croatian film director
 Branko Segota (born 1961), Croatian-Canadian footballer
 Branko Skroče (born 1955), Croatian basketball player
 Branko Smiljanić (born 1957), Serbian football manager
 Branko Stanković (1921–2000), Bosnian Serb football player and manager
 Branko Stanovnik (born 1938), Slovenian chemist
 Branko Strupar (born 1970), Croatian-Belgian footballer
 Branko Štrbac (born 1957), Yugoslav handball player
 Branko Tomović (born 1980), Serbian-German actor
 Branko Tucak (born 1952), Croatian football manager
 Branko Vukelić (1958–2013), Croatian politician
 Branko Zebec (1929–1988), Croatian football player and manager

Other
 Branko's Bridge
 Branko, artist's name of Branko (João Barbosa), Portuguese musician, see Buraka Som Sistema

See also
 
 Branislav
 Branković
 Brankovina
 Brankovići (Rogatica)

Slavic masculine given names
Bosnian masculine given names
Croatian masculine given names
Serbian masculine given names